Craig Padilla is an American ambient musician and film score composer, actor, and video producer from Redding, California.

Since the mid-90s he has released more than a dozen albums with music primarily inspired by the Berlin School of electronic music and space music on the labels Space For Music, Spotted Peccary Music, Lotuspike, Fruits de Mer Records, and Groove Unlimited, and contributed to numerous compilations, including a tribute album to Michael Garrison.

He also edits and produces videos for local television commercials, infomercials, corporate events, and music videos (he created the video for Bruce Turgon's and Philip Bardowell's collaborative project PLACES OF POWER) through his production company known as Craig Padilla Creative Video and Sound Productions.

Reception
Jim Brenholts (Allmusic) describes Padilla as "one of the premier Berlin school sequencers in the U.S.A." while Stewart Mason (also Allmusic) calls him a "Berlin-based electronic music guru" which is factually a bit misleading, as Craig Padilla lives and performs live in California.

Discography
The discography includes only albums released on compact disc, digital download, and vinyl record.

 Eye of the Storm (See Peace Records 1996)
 Patterns of Thought (See Peace Records 1998)
 The Soul Within (See Peace Music 1999)
 Beyond Beta with Skip Murphy (See Peace Music 1999)
 Crystal Garden (See Peace Music 1999)
 Beyond Volume 1 with Skip Murphy (See Peace Music 1999)
 Edge of Eternity (See Peace Music 1999)
 Eccentric Spheres (See Peace Music 2000)
 Music for the Mind - Live (Vol. 1) (See Peace Music 2000)
 Music for the Mind - Live (Vol. 2) (See Peace Music 2000)
 Perspectives on the Dreamworld (See Peace Music 2000)
 Reflections in Mercury with Skip Murphy (See Peace Music 2001)
 Temporal Suspension with Skip Murphy (Space For Music 2001)
 Folding Space and Melting Galaxies (Space For Music 2002)
 Vostok (Spotted Peccary, March 2002)
 Planetary Elements with Skip Murphy (Space For Music, September 2003)
 Echo System with Paul Ellis (GROOVE Unlimited, March 2004)
 Genesis (Spotted Peccary, May 2004)
 Planetary Elements (Volume 2) with Skip Murphy (Space For Music, 2005)
 Path of Least Resistance with Zero Ohms (Lotuspike, October 2005)
 Phantasma with Skip Murphy (GROOVE Unlimited, 2006)
 The Light in the Shadow (Spotted Peccary, November 2006)
 Analog Destination with Skip Murphy (GROOVE Unlimited, 2008)
 Below the Mountain (Spotted Peccary, April 2008)
 Cycles (Hemi-Sync / Monroe Institute Products, November 2008)
 Beyond the Portal with Zero Ohms & Skip Murphy (Lotuspike, February 2009)
 The Heart of The Soul (Spotted Peccary, May 2012)
 When The Earth Is Far Away with Zero Ohms (Lotuspike, October 2012)
 strange fish 1 shared LP with Sendelica (Fruits de Mer Records, June 2013)
 Sonar double LP (Fruits de Mer Records, June 2014)
 Land of Spirit (Hemi-Sync / Monroe Institute Products, October 2014)
 Life Flows Water with Howard Givens (Spotted Peccary, March 2015)
 Short Circuits lathe-cut LP (Fruits de Mer Records, June 2015)
 Spirit Holy Rising EP/single with Howard Givens (Spotted Peccary, December 2015)
 Heaven Condensed (Spotted Peccary, January 2016)
 Awakening Consciousness with Howard Givens (Hemi-Sync / Monroe Institute Products, June 2016)
 Being of Light with Howard Givens (Spotted Peccary, September 2017)
 Patterns of Thought (Special Remastered Edition) (See Peace Music, December 2017)
 The Heart of the Galaxy (Special Remastered Edition) (See Peace Music, August 2018)
 Aquarii (Limited Edition) (See Peace Music, August 2018)
 Tenderness Avalanche as THE FELLOWSHIP OF HALLUCINATORY VOYAGERS (with Pete Bingham) (FRG Records, January 2019)
 Toward the Horizon with Marvin Allen (Spotted Peccary Music, February 2019)
 The Bodhi Mantra with Howard Givens (Spotted Peccary, June 2020)
 Waveforms with Skip Murphy (See Peace Music, December 2020)
 Strange Gravity with Marvin Allen (Spotted Peccary Music, January 2021)
 Precipice of a Dream with Howard Givens and Madhavi Devi (Spotted Peccary, May 2021)
 Perspectives on the Dreamworld (20th Anniversary Edition) (See Peace Music April 2021)
 Discovery of Meaning (Spotted Peccary, February 2022)
 Universe (30th Anniversary Edition) with Skip Murphy (See Peace Music June 2022)

Film Scores
 Phobias (Fear Film/Sub Rosa Studios, April 2003)
 Realms of Blood with Skip Murphy (Fear Film/Sub Rosa Studios, August 2004)
 Dark Woods (JDB/Alliance, May 2006)
 Space Crüesader Xbox 360 video game (Unfinity Games, November 2012)

Voice Acting
 Hans Bearnt in Growlanser II: The Sense of Justice video game for PlayStation 2 (Working Designs, 2004)
 Bulrell in Summon Night 6: Lost Borders video game for PlayStation 4 and PSVita (Gaijinworks, October 2017)

References

External links
 Craig Padilla Official Website
  at Padilla's Facebook Music website
  at Spotted Peccary's website
 
 
 Craig Padilla at Discogs
 Craig Padilla at Last.fm
 Craig Padilla at Rate Your Music
 Craig Padilla at YouTube

Ambient musicians
American male composers
21st-century American composers
Living people
21st-century American male musicians
Year of birth missing (living people)
Fruits de Mer Records artists